The 2009 British Athletics Championships was the national championship in outdoor track and field for athletes in the United Kingdom, held from 10–12 July at Alexander Stadium in Birmingham. It was organised by UK Athletics. It served as a selection meeting for Great Britain at the 2009 World Championships in Athletics.

Results

Men

Women

References 

Aviva World Trials and National Championships. Power of 10. Retrieved 2020-01-28.
2009 British Athletics Championships. UK Athletics. Retrieved 2020-01-28.

External links
British Athletics website

British Outdoor Championships
British Athletics Championships
Athletics Outdoor
British Athletics Championships
Sports competitions in Birmingham, West Midlands
2000s in Birmingham, West Midlands